Sir Robert William Kerr Honeycombe,  (2 May 1921 – 14 September 2007) was a Goldsmiths' Professor of Metallurgy and Professor Emeritus of the University of Cambridge. He was an Honorary Fellow of Clare Hall, Cambridge. Born in Melbourne, Australia, Honeycombe was elected a Fellow of the Royal Society in March, 1981 and served on the council. He was knighted in 1990.

He was awarded the Beilby Medal and Prize in 1963.

References

1921 births
2007 deaths
Academics from Melbourne
Fellows of Clare Hall, Cambridge
Fellows of the Royal Society
Fellows of the Royal Academy of Engineering
Knights Bachelor
People educated at Geelong College
Presidents of Clare Hall, Cambridge
Goldsmiths' Professors of Materials Science